James A. Murray may refer to:

 James Albert Murray (1932–2020), Roman Catholic bishop
 James Alexander Murray (1864–1960), Conservative politician and Premier of New Brunswick
  James Augustus Henry Murray, first editor of the Oxford English Dictionary
 James A. Murray (zoologist), zoologist and museum curator in Karachi
  James A. Murray, uncle and mentor of U.S. Senator James E. Murray

See also
James Murray (disambiguation)